The Settlers Online (known as The Settlers Online: Castle Empire in the United States) is a freemium, online browser-based version inspired by The Settlers. A beta version of the game was released in Germany, Russia, and North America on October 22, 2010, with the final build released worldwide on September 19, 2011.

In the game, the player has to build a city, defeat bandit camps and complete quests to earn XP and level up, unlocking different new buildings, mines and soldiers.

References

External links
  
  
 The Guides by so-wiki 

2011 video games
4X video games
Browser games
Browser-based multiplayer online games
Free-to-play video games
Strategy video games
The Settlers
Blue Byte games
Video games developed in Germany